Leny is a civil parish in County Westmeath, Ireland. This name also applies to the townland of Leny; neither should be confused with the Falls of Leny in Scotland.

Leny is one of 8 civil parishes in the barony of Corkaree in the Province of Leinster.

Leny civil parish comprises 15 townlands: Ballinalack (village), Ballinalack, Ballynafid, Ballyvade, Clanhugh Demesne, Culleenabohoge, Culleendarragh, Cullenhugh, Farrow, Glebe, Kilpatrick, Knightswood, Leny, Rathaniska and Rathbennett.

The neighbouring civil parishes are: Russagh, Lackan and Multyfarnham to the north, Tyfarnham to the east, Portloman,  
Portnashangan and Templeoran to the south and Kilbixy (barony of Moygoish) and Rathaspick (Moygoish) to the west.

References

External links
Leny civil parish at the IreAtlas Townland Data Base
Leny civil parish at Townlands.ie
Leny civil parish at Logainm.ie

Civil parishes of County Westmeath